Physonota alutacea, the wild olive tortoise beetle, is a species of leaf beetle in the family Chrysomelidae. It is found in Central America, North America, and South America.

References

Further reading

External links

 

Cassidinae
Articles created by Qbugbot
Beetles described in 1854